Jane Foole, also known as Jane The Foole, Jane, The Queen's Fool, "Jeanne le Fol" or "Jane Hir Fole" (fl. 1543–1558), was an English court fool (distinct from a jester). She was the fool of queens Catherine Parr and Mary I, and possibly also of Anne Boleyn.

Today, entertainers sometimes perform as "Jane" in Renaissance-themed entertainments such as Renaissance faires.

Life

Personal life 

Jane's full name, birth year, and background are unknown. Beden the Fool also appears in related notes of the time, and it has been suggested that Beden was her surname.

Jane is believed to have had a learning disability.

Career
In the accounts of Anne Boleyn, bills for caps supplied to her "female jester" are recorded in 1535–36. The name of this female jester is not mentioned, but may have been Jane.

In 1537, she is noted to be in service of Princess Mary. As well as Jane, Mary also employed Lucretia the Tumbler. Lucretia and Jane are known to have performed together, and Lucretia may have been Jane's minder.

When Catherine Parr became queen in 1543, Jane may have been transferred to Catherine's household. Jane was a well-liked jester at the court of Catherine Parr, where she is mentioned by name as "Jane Foole" in 1543. She may have been depicted in the painting of Henry the Eighth and His Family (1545), in which the man on the far right is identified as her colleague, court jester William Sommers. Jane is among several women suggested as the figure on the left, in the matching end panel to his. Catherine Parr died in 1548. Jane Fool apparently returned to Mary.

When Mary I came to the throne in 1553, Jane was in her employ. She apparently had a favoured position with Mary and was given a valuable wardrobe and an unusually large number of shoes. Her head was shaved, just as the heads of male jesters.

Jane hurt her eye in 1557. Mary gave gilt silver salts as rewards to two women who looked after her, a Mistress Ayer and a woman from Bury St Edmunds who healed her.

It has been suggested that Jane was married to Will Sommers, but this has not been confirmed. It is known that Jane and Will Sommers often performed together, dressed in matching outfits: they are noted to have done so in 1555.

It is not known what happened to her after Mary's death in 1558.

Fiction

Philippa Gregory's historical novel The Queen's Fool is focused on a female jester active in the court of Mary I, though the fictional character is not called  "Jane Foole".

Jane Fool appears as a character in C. J. Sansom’s novel Lamentation.

References

Sources 

 

Jesters
Year of birth unknown
Year of death unknown
16th-century English women
English courtiers
Household of Anne Boleyn
Court of Mary I of England
Household of Catherine Parr